Genesee Valley Center is an enclosed shopping mall located in Flint Township, Michigan, outside the city of Flint, Michigan, United States. The mall has three anchor tenants: JCPenney, Macy's, and Play Big. It comprises more than 120 tenants, including a food court, and an external concourse called the Outdoor Village which also features a Barnes & Noble bookstore. The mall is located on Miller Road and Linden Road, near the junction of Interstate 69 (I-69) and I-75.

History

Genesee Valley Center was developed in 1970 by Shopping Centers, Inc. of Southfield, Michigan, a retail division of Detroit, Michigan-based Hudson's department stores. It was built as a one-level, enclosed shopping mall, consisting of a straight-line concourse with an anchor store at either end. Sears, the northern anchor, was the first store to open, doing so in May 1970. Hudson's followed two months later, with this location being the chain's largest store outside of Detroit. These two stores served as the northern and southern anchor stores to the mall, respectively. On August 8, 1970, Genesee Valley Center opened to the public. At the time, it comprised fifty-six tenants, including a Hamady Brothers supermarket and Cunningham Drug. By September, a Woolworth dime store had opened next to Sears.

In 1979, an eastern wing anchored by JCPenney was added to the mall. A mezzanine level with a food court was added in 1987. The Cunningham Drug Store was demolished for a wing featuring a Mervyns in 1993, Montgomery Ward was also added. Woolworth was briefly downsized to a cosmetics-oriented prototype called Woolworth Express before closing entirely. In 2001, Montgomery Ward had closed the last of its store nationwide. The same year, Hudson's was renamed Marshall Field's, which itself became Macy's when the parent company of Marshall Field's was acquired.

Mid-2000s onward
The former Montgomery Ward location was demolished in 2005 for a new section called the Outdoor Village. Opened in early 2006, this addition features additional mall tenants in an outdoor setting. Anchoring the Outdoor Village is a Barnes & Noble bookstore, the opening of which resulted in the closure of a B. Dalton bookstore within the mall itself.

Mervyns also closed its Michigan operations in early 2006. A year later, their space at the mall was replaced with Burlington Coat Factory (now known as Burlington), which relocated from an existing store nearby. Steve & Barry's was added in the former Woolworth space. It closed in early 2009 when the chain declared bankruptcy, and became a clothing store called Wear District in October. Wear District later closed and became Shoe Dept. Encore. In 2012, the mall was sold to by Jones Lang LaSalle to Spinoso Group.

Since 2002, the mall has had a branch of Genesee District Library in it. The branch was first opened as an experiment. It was first slated for closure in October 2013, but the library board instead decided to keep it open until at least 2014. Also in 2013, several storefronts were remodeled throughout the mall, including Bath & Body Works, Kay Jewelers, Justice, and Victoria's Secret. Lane Bryant, an original tenant, moved to a new space in the mall in 2014 which had been vacated by a Ruby Tuesday. A Planet Fitness opened in the Burlington Coat Factory wing in early 2015. A H&M opened in the JCPenney wing in November 2017.

Burlington relocated to a nearby strip mall on May 11, 2018. Sears closed on September 2, 2018, which leaves JCPenney and Macy's as the only anchors left. On December 15, 2018, Play Big, an indoor playground consisting of mostly inflatable bounce houses and arcade games, opened in the former Burlington store.

In 2019, Forever 21 moved from its existing location near JCPenney to a larger location near Macy's, but it closed later that year.

In December 2019 The mall was sold to Namdar Realty Group, which in turn made drastic cuts to the malls operational staff. Allied Universal’s mall security contract was terminated effective December 31, 2019, and Namdar Group opted to use In House Security personnel as well as in house housekeeping.

References

External links
Official website

Shopping malls established in 1970
Shopping malls in Michigan
Buildings and structures in Flint, Michigan
Namdar Realty Group